Dongjak B is a constituency of the National Assembly of South Korea. The constituency consists of part of Dongjak District, Seoul. As of 2016, 161,781 eligible voters were registered in the constituency.

List of members of the National Assembly

Recent election results

2020

2016

2014 (by-election)

2012

2008

References 

Constituencies of the National Assembly (South Korea)